2942 Cordie, provisional designation , is an asteroid from the inner regions of the asteroid belt, approximately 7 kilometers in diameter. It was discovered on 29 January 1932, by German astronomer Karl Reinmuth at Heidelberg Observatory in southwest Germany.

The asteroid has a long rotation period of roughly 80 hours. It was named after of Cordie Robinson, planetary geologist at the Center for Astrophysics  Harvard & Smithsonian.

References 
 

 Pravec, P.; Wolf, M.; Sarounova, L. (2006) http://www.asu.cas.cz/~ppravec/neo.htm
 Pray, D.P.; Kusnirak, P.; Galad, A.; Vilagi, J.; et al. (2007) Minor Planet Bul. 34, 44-46.

External links 
 Dictionary of Minor Planet Names, Google books
 
 

002942
Discoveries by Karl Wilhelm Reinmuth
Named minor planets
19320129